The 1992 United States House of Representatives elections in Kansas were held on November 3, 1992, to determine who will represent the state of Kansas in the United States House of Representatives. Kansas has four seats in the House, apportioned according to the 1990 United States Census. Representatives are elected for two-year terms.

Overview

References 

Kansas
1992
1992 Kansas elections